Stephen Howard may refer to:
Stephen Howard (basketball) (born 1970), US athlete in professional basketball
Stephen Howard (cricketer) (born 1949), Australian athlete in cricket
Stephen Howard (rugby league) (born 1987), American rugby league player
Stephen Howard (politician) (1867–1934), English politician
Stephen Gerald Howard (1896–1973), British farmer, barrister, judge and politician

See also
SteVen Howard (disambiguation)